Erin Classen (born 18 August 2004 in Perth) is an Australian professional squash player. As of June 2022, she was ranked number 239 in the world. She won the 2022 Golden Open.

References

2004 births
Living people
Australian female squash players
21st-century Australian women